Aekyom (Akium), also known as Awin (Aiwin) is a Papuan language of Papua New Guinea.

Phonology
The following table details the consonants of Aekyom.

Consonant
{| class="wikitable" style="text-align: center;"
|-
! colspan = "2" |
! Bilabial
! Alveolar
! Palatal
! Velar
! Glottal
|-
! colspan = "2" | Nasal
| 
| 
| 
| 
|
|-
! rowspan = "3" | Plosive
! 
| 
| 
| 
| 
|
|-
! 
| 
| 
|
| 
|
|-
! 
| 
| 
|
| 
|
|-
! colspan = "2" | Fricative
|
| 
|
|
| 
|-
! colspan = "2" | Approximant
| 
| 
| 
|
| 
|-
|}

Vowels

References

Awin–Pa languages
Languages of Western Province (Papua New Guinea)